Love Day - Pyaar Ka Din is an Indian comedy drama film based on friendship, which was written and directed by Harish Kotian and Sandeep Choudhary. The movie features Ajaz khan, Sahil Anand, Harsh Nagar and Shalu Singh in the lead roles. This film was released on 14 October 2016.

Plot
Life without friends is like living in hell, but when you have friends who are no less than devils, your life can be a living hell. Love Day - Pyaar Ka Din explores the journey of three childhood friends; Monty (Ajaz Khan), Sandy (Sahil Anand) and Harry (Harsh Nagar).  Sandy and Harry often fall into trouble due to Monty's antics. Sandy's and Harry's families do not approve of their friendship with Monty and separate the three friends. However, Monty returns to his friend's lives after five years with a plan that would make them all rich. Monty's plan backfires and his friends land into trouble again. Will Sandy and Harry regret their lifelong friendship?

Cast
 Ajaz Khan as Monty  
 Sahil Anand as Sandy
 Harsh Nagar as Harry
 Anant Mahadevan as Dr. Sheikh 
 Vaibhav Mathur as Prabhu
 Shalu Singh as Saheba

Production 
Love Day - Pyaar Ka Din was shot in locations like Dehradun, Shimla, Mumbai, Panvel, and Lonavala. A part of the film was shot at the Graphic Era University (GEU) Campus in Dehradun.

Music 
The music directors of the film are Sumesh Himanshu, Raina Sawan, Sagar Sarkar and Vishnu Narayan. The lyricists are Himanshu Joshi, Aslam Soni and Ravi Babu. The songs are sung by Mika, Shaan, Mohit Chauhan, Anis Sharma, Bhumi Trivedi  and Shreya Shaleen.

External links

References 

2016 films
2010s Hindi-language films
Films set in Mumbai
Films set in Dehradun
Films set in Shimla